Tao Business is an EP by the Serbian noise-rock band Klopka Za Pionira, released in 2007 (see 2007 in music) on the Ne-ton independent label. It has only one song, albeit almost twenty minutes long, which is actually an excerpt from one of the band's sessions with Vladimir Palibrk (the brother of their regular drummer Vuk Palibrk) on drums as a special guest. The whole song was recorded in one take at the Pančevo gallery Elektrika, all instruments at the same time, and is built on improvisation. The result is a drone, noise tune with a free-jazz form. There are almost no lyrics and surprisingly little guitar while the bass guitar, drums and electronics dominate.


Track listing
All lyrics by Mileta Mijatović and music by Klopka Za Pionira
"Tao Business" – 18:38

Personnel
Mileta Mijatović - vocals
Damjan Brkić - guitar, drum machine
Vladimir Lenhart - bass guitar, tapes
Vladimir Palirbk - drums (special guest)

References

External links 
 

Klopka Za Pionira albums
2007 EPs